Tapatío is an American hot sauce produced in Vernon, California. It is popular mainly in the United States, predominantly among Mexican American communities.

The product is named after a term used to describe someone from Guadalajara, Jalisco - which the company's founders emigrated from. It is exported to Mexico, Canada, Central America, Australia, and elsewhere.

Product details
The ingredients, as listed on the product label, are water, red peppers, salt, spices, garlic, acetic acid, xanthan gum and sodium benzoate as a preservative. The sauce overall has a Scoville heat scale rating of 3,000, hotter than Sriracha.

The product slogan is "Es una salsa ... Muy salsa" ("It's a sauce... Very saucy").

History
The Tapatío Hot Sauce company was started in 1971 by Jose-Luis Saavedra Sr., in a  warehouse in Maywood, California.  In 1985, the company moved to a  facility in Vernon, California,  from Downtown Los Angeles. Although larger than the first location, the new factory had a single loading dock and limited storage space, which created a new series of problems for the company. After a long search, a site was found for a developer to custom-build a new  facility, which Tapatío presently occupies.  The new factory has several loading docks and automated production.

Other products
In 2011, Frito-Lay released a line of Tapatío-flavored Doritos, Ruffles, and Fritos in the United States.

Tapatío Ramen was introduced in 2018.

In 2021, to celebrate the 50th anniversary of the brand, they collaborated with Gabriel Iglesias for a special edition of the hot sauce, Tapatio X Fluffy.

See also
 Food production
 List of hot sauces

References

External links
 Tapatío official website

Brand name condiments
Companies based in Los Angeles County, California
Hot sauces
Vernon, California
Condiment companies of the United States